Roeland Lievens (born 1 July 1983) is a Dutch rower. He competed in the Men's lightweight coxless four event at the 2012 Summer Olympics.

References

External links
 

1983 births
Living people
Dutch male rowers
Olympic rowers of the Netherlands
Rowers at the 2012 Summer Olympics
People from Sluis
Sportspeople from Zeeland
21st-century Dutch people